Percy Poe Bishop (May 27, 1877 – April 8, 1967) was an  American major general active during World War I.

Early life 
Bishop was born in Powell, Tennessee. In 1898, he graduated from the University of Tennessee with a B.S. and was commissioned a second lieutenant in the 4th Field Artillery Regiment on July 9 of that year.

Career 

He was an honor graduate of the Artillery School in 1902 and an instructor there through 1903. He served as assistant to the Chief of Coast Artillery from 1907 to 1911. From 1914 to 1917, Bishop was assistant to the Chief of Coast Artillery, and was transferred to the General Staff Corps on October 16, 1917 when he became assistant to the secretary of the General Staff. On February 6, 1918 he was promoted to colonel. On March 21, 1918, he became secretary of the General staff. He was promoted to brigadier general on October 1, 1918 and held the rank until November 1, 1919, when he reverted to his peacetime rank. From September 1918 to October 1921, he was chief of the Personnel Branch of the General Staff. In 1926, he graduated from the Army War College. He became a brigadier general in 1934 and a major general in 1938. Bishop retired in 1941.

He belonged to both the Army and Navy Club, the Chevy Chase Club, and the Omaha Club.

Awards
Bishop was awarded the Distinguished Service Medal for his performance of duty as secretary of the General Staff. The citation for his medal reads:

Death and legacy
Percy Poe Bishop died at the age of eighty-nine on April 8, 1967.

References 

Bibliography
Davis, Henry Blaine. Generals in Khaki. Raleigh, NC: Pentland Press, 1998.  
Marquis Who's Who, Inc. Who Was Who in American History, the Military. Chicago: Marquis Who's Who, 1975.  
"Valor Awards for Percy Poe Bishop." Valor Awards for Percy Poe Bishop. Military Times, n.d. Web. 18 Aug. 2016. <http://valor.militarytimes.com/recipient.php?recipientid=17272>.

1877 births
1967 deaths
People from Knox County, Tennessee
University of Tennessee alumni
United States Army generals of World War I
United States Army generals
Military personnel from Tennessee
United States Army War College alumni